Bartonella capreoli is a pathogenic bacteria first isolated from European ruminants. It is small, fastidious, aerobic, oxidase-negative, gram-negative and rod-shaped. Its type strain is IBS 193T (= CIP 106691T = CCUG 43827T).

References

Further reading

Armon, Robert, and Uta Cheruti. Environmental aspects of zoonotic diseases. IWA Publishing, 2012.

Duncan, Ashlee Walker. Comparative Epidemiology of Bartonella Infection in Dogs and Humans. ProQuest, 2007.

External links

LPSN
Type strain of Bartonella capreoli at BacDive -  the Bacterial Diversity Metadatabase

Bartonellaceae
Bacteria described in 2002